Verticordia brevifolia is a flowering plant in the myrtle family, Myrtaceae and is endemic to the south-west of Western Australia. It is a small shrub with shortly cylindrical leaves and bright yellow flowers which turn red as they age. There are two subspecies, both of which have limited distributions and a priority conservation rating.

Description

The petals are also bright yellow, with long, spreading, finger-like projections. Flowering time is from September to November.

Taxonomy and naming
Verticordia brevifolia was first formally described by Alex George in 1991 and the description was published in Nuytsia from specimens collected near Nyabing by Alex and Elizabeth George. The specific epithet (brevifolia) is derived from the Latin words brevis meaning "short" and folium meaning "leaf".

There are two subspecies:

George placed this species in subgenus Chrysoma, section Jugata along with V. chrysanthella, V. chrysantha, V. galeata, V. coronata, V. amphigia and V. laciniata.

Distribution and habitat
All the known populations of subspecies brevifolia occur in gravelly clay on roadsides between Nyabing, Dumbleyung and Ongerup in the Avon Wheatbelt, Jarrah Forest and Mallee biogeographic regions. Subspecies stirlingensis is mostly only found in the Stirling Range National Park in the Esperance Plains and Mallee biogeographic regions where it grows in gravel, sand or loam in heath, shrubland or woodland.

Conservation
Subspecies brevifolia is classified as "Priority Three" by the Western Australian Government Department of Parks and Wildlife because all the known populations occur on roadsides. Subspecies stirlingensis is classified as Priority Two because there are only a few known populations of this plant.

Use in horticulture
Subspecies brevifolia has proven to be easier to propagate and grow than stirlingensis and has been cultivated for more than eight years where it is a small shrub with brightly coloured flowers. Propagation from cuttings is usual, and the plants are tolerant of light frosts.

References

brevifolia
Rosids of Western Australia
Eudicots of Western Australia
Plants described in 1991